Gonzalo Ariel Montiel (born 1 January 1997) is an Argentine professional footballer who plays as right-back for La Liga club Sevilla and the Argentina national team. 

He began his professional career with River Plate in 2016, playing 139 games and winning honours including the Argentine Primera División in 2021 and the Copa Libertadores in 2018. In 2021, he signed for Sevilla for €11 million.

Montiel made his international debut for Argentina in 2019. He was a part of the squads that won the 2021 Copa América and 2022 FIFA World Cup, scoring the winning penalty in the shoot-out of the latter final.

Club career

River Plate 
Born in González Catán, Buenos Aires Province, Montiel was a product of the Club Atlético River Plate academy. In October 2015, manager Marcelo Gallardo called the 18-year-old up for the first time for an Argentine Primera División game at Defensa y Justicia; he was unused in the 1–0 loss on 15 October. He made his debut on 30 April 2016 in his one appearance of that season, as a half-time substitute for Pablo Carreras in a goalless draw at home to Club Atlético Vélez Sarsfield; Gallardo had made 11 changes to his team with an eye to a Copa Libertadores second leg against C.S.D. Independiente del Valle.

Montiel played four league matches the 2016–17 season. On 30 October, he was sent off in a 2–2 draw at Arsenal de Sarandí. He lifted the Copa Argentina trophy after playing all the matches from the last 16 to the final, in which his team beat Atlético Tucumán. He played in the 2017 Copa Libertadores, scoring a goal and assisting three, playing every minute from the quarter-finals to the semi-finals, where River Plate were defeated by Club Atlético Lanús; his first career goal came on 1 November in a 4–2 loss at Lanús.

In the 2017–18 season, Montiel played 35 matches, fifteen of them coming in the league. He made 14 appearances he made as the team lifted the Copa Libertadores at the Santiago Bernabéu Stadium against Superclásico rivals Boca Juniors. Playing five matches in the Copa Argentina, the team were eliminated on penalties in the semi-finals against Club de Gimnasia y Esgrima La Plata. The team secured a double that season as they beat Boca  in the Supercopa Argentina.

The following season, Montiel played 12 matches in the league without being substituted. For the second season in a row, Montiel reached the Copa Libertadores final after twelve matches; however, River Plate would be defeated by CR Flamengo. He won the Copa Argentina once more as River beat Central Córdoba - he played every minute in the cup run. After winning last season's Copa Libertadores, River contested the FIFA Club World Cup where they finished third. An injury prevented him from playing in the Super Cup. After recovering, he returned to contest the Recopa as River overcame a 1–0 first-leg defeat to win the trophy with a 3–0 win against Club Athletico Paranaense.

On 20 February 2021, Montiel scored his first league goal for River, a penalty in a 3–0 win against Rosario Central in the first game at the Estadio Monumental after a six-month renovation.

Sevilla 
On 13 August 2021, La Liga club Sevilla FC signed Montiel on a five-year deal for €11 million. Manager Julen Lopetegui signed him to compete with club icon Jesús Navas at right back after the exit of Aleix Vidal. He made his debut on 14 September in a UEFA Champions League group stage 1–1 home draw against FC Red Bull Salzburg, replacing Navas for the last three minutes. Eight days later, he made his league bow by starting against Valencia CF at the Ramón Sánchez Pizjuán Stadium, scoring in the 15th minute of a 3–1 win before making way for Navas before the hour.

Montiel was sent off on 6 November 2022 in a 1–1 Seville derby draw at Real Betis for a 38th-minute foul on Álex Moreno.

International career
In March 2019, Argentina manager Lionel Scaloni called up Montiel as one of ten domestic-based players for friendlies against Venezuela and Morocco. He made his debut on 22 March against Venezuela at the Metropolitano Stadium in Madrid, playing the entirety of a 3–1 loss.

On 11 June 2021, Montiel was one of the 28-man squad announced by Argentina for the 2021 Copa América tournament. He played four of the seven matches played by the  team in the tournament including the final victory, which he had to complete with a bleeding ankle as a result of a tackle from Fred in the first half of the game.

In November 2022, Montiel was named in the final squad for the 2022 FIFA World Cup in Qatar. On 18 December, he conceded a penalty late in extra time after a handball which Kylian Mbappé scored, but Montiel then scored the tournament-winning penalty kick for Argentina in a 4–2 victory against France to win the final, when the game went to penalties after a 3–3 draw.

Career statistics

Club

International

Honours
River Plate
Argentine Primera División: 2021
Copa Argentina: 2015–16, 2016–17, 2018–19
Supercopa Argentina: 2017, 2019
Copa Libertadores: 2018
Recopa Sudamericana: 2016, 2019

Argentina
FIFA World Cup: 2022
Copa América: 2021
CONMEBOL–UEFA Cup of Champions: 2022

References

External links

Profile at the Sevilla FC website

1997 births
Living people
People from La Matanza Partido
Sportspeople from Buenos Aires Province
Argentine footballers
Association football defenders
Argentina international footballers
Argentina under-20 international footballers
2021 Copa América players
2022 FIFA World Cup players
Argentine Primera División players
La Liga players
Club Atlético River Plate footballers
Sevilla FC players
Copa América-winning players
Copa Libertadores-winning players
FIFA World Cup-winning players
Argentine expatriate footballers
Argentine expatriate sportspeople in Spain
Expatriate footballers in Spain